Orionair was a charter airline based in Valencia, Spain.

History
Orionair was established in 2004 and operated domestic and international services in Europe and to Tunisia. Its main base was Valencia Airport, with a hub at Madrid Barajas International Airport. It had offices in Madrid and Valencia and it was part of the TravelPlan group.

The airline suspended operations on 04 June 2009.

Destinations 
Orionair operated mainly services to Europe such as Salerno and Bucharest.

Fleet
The Orionair fleet included the following aircraft (as of 4 July 2009):

2 BAe 146-300 (which are operated for Syrian Pearl Airlines)
1 Embraer EMB 120 Brasilia

See also

List of defunct airlines of Spain

References

External links 

Defunct airlines of Spain
Airlines established in 2004
Airlines disestablished in 2008